Guido Andreozzi (born 5 August 1991) is an Argentine professional tennis player of Italian descent. He competes mainly on the ATP Challenger Tour and ITF Futures, both in singles and doubles. His career-high rankings are World No. 70 in singles (January 2019) and No. 83 in doubles (February 2023).

Personal life and background

Andreozzi started playing tennis at 6 with father at Club Harrods. His father, Jorge, is a construction worker and his mother, Nora Potente, is an accountant. He also has one brother named Franco. Guido attended school at Colegio Nicolas Avellaneda. He stated that his favourite surface is hard, shot is forehand and tournament is US Open. Idol growing up was Roger Federer. Hobbies include spending time with friends, listening to music, playing football and watching TV shows and movies. He is big fan of Boca Juniors football team. Currently trains at Club Liceo Naval. Fitness trainer is Mariano Gaute.

Juniors
As a junior Andreozzi posted a 34-16 singles record and reached a career-high combined ranking of No. 146 in the world.

Career highlights

2018: First Grand Slam win
Following wins over Dustin Brown, Corentin Denolly and Mohamed Safwat, he qualified for the main draw of the 2018 French Open. There, he defeated American Taylor Fritz in the first round. He was defeated in the second round by Fernando Verdasco.

2023
At the Mexican Open he reached the main draw as a qualifier having been selected as an alternate for the qualifying competition.

Singles performance timeline

''Current through the 2021 US Open.

Challenger and Futures finals

Singles: 23 (15 titles, 8 runner–ups)

Doubles: 48 (32 titles, 16 runner–ups)

References

External links

 
 

1991 births
Living people
Argentine male tennis players
Pan American Games gold medalists for Argentina
Pan American Games silver medalists for Argentina
Tennis players at the 2015 Pan American Games
Pan American Games medalists in tennis
South American Games gold medalists for Argentina
South American Games silver medalists for Argentina
South American Games medalists in tennis
Competitors at the 2014 South American Games
Pan American Games bronze medalists for Argentina
Tennis players at the 2019 Pan American Games
Medalists at the 2015 Pan American Games
Medalists at the 2019 Pan American Games
Tennis players from Buenos Aires
21st-century Argentine people